Michael P. Flanagan served as State Superintendent in Michigan from 2005 to July 2015. Flanagan chairs the State Board of Education and is the Chief Executive Officer of the Michigan Department of Education. Michigan's State Superintendent advises the State Board of Education, the Governor, and the state Legislature regarding public education in Michigan.

Portfolio

Flanagan also serves on several national and state Boards of Directors, including: Council of Chief State School Officers (CCSSO) Executive Board Member; Education Commission of the States (ECS) Steering Committee Member; Michigan Virtual University Executive Board Member; Library of Michigan Executive Board Member; MI Governor's Talent Investment Board Member; the Michigan Public School Employees’ Retirement System Board Member and Michigan's Superintendent of Public Instruction.

Personal

Flanagan has degrees from the University of Notre Dame and Eastern Michigan University. He is married to Anna and has three married children:  Mike, Brian, and Christa, with grandchildren:  Alysha, Ella, Avery, Will, Landen, Joey, and Brooklyn.

Awards

Flanagan is the first state superintendent of the United States to have been awarded with the "Distinguished Service Award" from the National Association of State Boards of Education. The award ceremony took place in July, 2013 in Arlington, Va. Nominated for the award by the Michigan State Board of Education, the annual award is given to a member of the organization to honor his work in the field of public education. "The bond of trust and a common goal between Michael Flanagan and the Michigan State Board clearly runs deep given the board's nomination of Mike, the first time a state superintendent has received this award. We are proud to recognize him today for his diligent and continued leadership in improving public education for all of Michigan's children" said NASBE Executive Director Kristen Amundson.

References

External links
Michael P Flanagan, State Superintendent

Living people
Year of birth missing (living people)
Michigan Superintendents of Public Instruction
Educators from Michigan
University of Notre Dame alumni
Eastern Michigan University alumni